The Anzob Tunnel, Istiqlol tunnel or Ushtur Tunnel is a 5,040 m long tunnel located  northwest of Tajikistan's capital Dushanbe, at an elevation of . The tunnel is part of the M34 highway and connects the Tajik capital to the country's second largest city, Khujand. The tunnel was opened in 2006 despite being only partially finished. In 2014 Iran's government signed an agreement to finish the tunnel and the tunnel was reopened in late 2015. The tunnel saves drivers at least 4 hours when traveling between Dushanbe and Khujand and allows travelers to avoid having to pass through Uzbekistan.

Strategic importance 
Its construction put an end to Uzbekistan's ability to halt traffic between Tajikistan's two largest cities (the two countries have suffered from long-term diplomatic disputes). It marked the beginning of other major co-operative projects such as the Sangtuda-2 power plant.

The tunnel is also said to be part of a planned road which would run from Iran through Herat in western Afghanistan and Mazar-i-Sharif and Sherkhan Bandar in northern Afghanistan to Tajikistan and from there up to China. The route has been named the new Silk Road.

It is also a transit route between Dushanbe and Uzbekistan's capital Tashkent. Prior to construction of the tunnel, especially during winter, the threat of year-round avalanches led to periodic disruptions of commerce.

Construction timeline 

The tunnel was officially opened in March 2006; it was built by the Iranian Sabir Co. Due to the significance of the tunnel, limited traffic flow was permitted via signing a waiver form noting potential hazards such as flooding and smog from construction equipment operating inside the tunnel prior to the final construction phase which may have included installation of ventilation and drainage infrastructure.

As of May 2014, the tunnel was still unfinished and the Iranian government and Tajik government had signed an agreement to complete the project by late March 2015. The tunnel was closed in June 2015 for repair work and reopened for traffic in September 2015 after leakage problems and concreting the base and lighting the tunnel was completed. It was officially inaugurated in August 2017.

References 

Tunnels in Tajikistan
Tunnels completed in 2006
Road tunnels